In comics, Warlock may refer to:

Warlock (New Mutants), a cybernetic alien member of the New Mutants superhero team in Marvel Comics
Warlock, a villain in the 1966 animated TV series The New Adventures of Superman
Adam Warlock, a space-traveling superhero in Marvel Comics
Maha Yogi, a Marvel Comics character who has also gone by the names Warlock and Mad Merlin

See also
Warlock (disambiguation)

fr:Warlock (comics)